The WNBA All-Defensive Team is an annual Women's National Basketball Association (WNBA) honor given since the 2005 WNBA season to the best defensive players during the regular season. Voting is conducted by the WNBA head coaches who are not allowed to vote for players on their own team. The All-Defensive Team is composed of two five-woman lineups, a first and a second team, comprising a total of 10 roster spots. The players each receive two points for each first team vote and one point for each second team vote. The top five players with the highest point total make the first team, with the next five making the second team. Respect is given to positions, however. For example, if there is already a center on the first team, but another center received more points than two of the guards on the first team, that center will still be on the second team.

Tamika Catchings has the record for the most total selections with 11. Catchings has 10 first team selections and 1 second team selection.

In 2020, Defensive Player of the Year Candace Parker, was not selected to either of the WNBA All-Defensive Teams.  This is the first time in the history of the award that the Defensive Player of the Year was not selected to an All-Defensive Team in the WNBA and in the NBA.  It reflects a difference in voters: The WNBA's defensive player of the year is voted on by media, while the all-defensive teams are voted on by the league's coaches.

Winners

2005 to present

References

Awards established in 2005
All, Wnba Defensive